A request line or contest line is a telephone line which allows listeners to a radio station (or sometimes a TV station) to call the radio studio or TV studio directly.  In radio, this is usually to request a song, win a contest, be a part of a talk show, or to ask a question of the disk jockey, such as what the name and artist of a recent song was.  Used occasionally in television, it is typically for telephone voting for an unscientific opinion poll in relation to news events, for a talk show, or sometimes to win a contest.

Telephone network
Although only one telephone number is usually announced, major stations typically have line hunting, with the same number being directed to any available one of several lines within the hunt group.  If there are no open lines, the calling party may receive a busy signal as with an ordinary telephone call, or sometimes the special information tones followed by a recorded announcement that "all circuits are busy, please try your call again later".  In this case, the line often first gives that caller a ringback tone as if the call were being completed, misleading callers to think they may have actually gotten through the swarm of other calls that sometimes flood these lines.

Within the North American Numbering Plan, telephone companies typically use special numbers for these lines, with a reserved prefix corresponding to high-capacity multi-line numbers instead of to a physical telephone exchange.  In Miami, for example, numbers are 305-550-xxxx, while in metro Atlanta they are 404-741-xxxx.  The last four digits are usually chosen by the station to be their callsign or frequency, or their moniker if it is short (such as B937 (2937) for a fictional B-93.7 FM).

When used on a radio or television program carried on a broadcast network, such a number is usually a toll-free telephone number, without a special number since it simply redirects to a local request line circuit.  This allows anyone to call regardless of the location, even from a payphone.  Some stations may have vertical service codes for use by mobile telephones.  These are also common in the United States for TV stations to advertise for gathering news tips from the public, but are often specific to callers on a certain sponsoring mobile telephone company.

Screening and editing
Calls typically come into the studio on a multi-line telephone, which is equipped to connect callers to the audio console and onto the air via a telephone hybrid.  However, in modern broadcasting, this is not always the case.

Call screeners may take the calls initially in an adjacent room (or simply away from the microphone), in order to determine which ones would get onto the air, particularly in the case of a talk show.  Most call-in shows have special software which the screener types the caller's information into, which in turn appears on the computer in front of the host.  This is how he or she knows how to introduce the caller by name and often by location.  This in turn alerts the caller, who has often been on hold for several minutes and may be listening to the radio or TV instead of the line, that he or she is now on the air.  Such a notification is often also a part of broadcast law if the caller may not have called with the expectation of being on the air.

A brief broadcast delay may be used to allow profanity or other inappropriate content (and possibly the caller) to be dropped, or voice tracking may be used to record calls to a computer, where the call can be digitally edited for time and content.  This method is most common with contest winners or callers to "all-request" shows like Delilah, and is done quickly for airplay just a few minutes later.  
Broadcasting
Telephony